Hellbender is a 2021 American horror film directed by, written by and starring John Adams, Zelda Adams and Toby Poser. The story follows a mother-daughter metal band living in an isolated woodland home, whose relationship is challenged when the daughter encounters other teenagers.

Plot
Izzy and her mother live a simple, peaceful existence in the woods, spending most their time creating metal music. After a chance meeting with a mysterious fellow teenager, Izzy begins to uncover the dark history of her family and their connections with witchcraft. Her relationship with her mother becomes increasingly strained as she deals with the darker revelations about her own budding interest in magic.

Cast
 Zelda Adams as Izzy
 Toby Poser as Mother
 Lulu Adams as Amber
 John Adams as Uncle
 Rinzin Thonden as AJ
 Khenzom as Ingrid

Production
John Adams and Toby Poser are married, and Lulu and Zelda are their children. Inspired by the musical project H6LLB6ND6R they had formed two years earlier, the family devised a film exploring parenting, witchcraft and matriarchy. The filmmaking family shot the film in their home in Catskill, New York during COVID-19 pandemic lockdowns, taking turns as the film crew. Many scenes and dialogue in the film were improvised.

Release
Hellbender premiered at the 25th Fantasia International Film Festival on August 14, 2021. It was released on Shudder on February 24, 2022.

Reception

 On Metacritic, the film has a weighted average score of 70 out of 100, based on 9 critics, indicating "generally favorable reviews".

Leslie Felperin of The Guardian awarded the film three out of five stars, praising the film's script, visual effects, and cinematography, calling it "[a] highly original exercise in folk horror". Katie Rife from The A.V. Club scored the film a grade B, commending the film's cinematography, visuals, editing, and performances, while also noting the films' low-budget special effects.

References

External links 
 

2021 films
2021 horror films
American supernatural horror films
Folk horror films
Heavy metal films
Shudder (streaming service) original programming
Films about witchcraft
Films about parenting
American coming-of-age films
Films about mother–daughter relationships
Films shot in New York (state)
Films based on music
Films impacted by the COVID-19 pandemic
2020s English-language films
2020s American films